So Full Of Love is a 1978 album by The O'Jays. The album contains the #1 R&B hit "Use ta Be My Girl", and was awarded RIAA Platinum Certification for sales of 1,000,000 copies.

The single "Brandy" has long been speculated by many fans to be about a woman. However, in 2013, production team Gamble and Huff revealed the song was, in fact, written about a dog.

Track listing
All songs written by Kenneth Gamble and Leon Huff, except where noted.

Side one 
 "Sing My Heart Out" - 4:25
 "Use Ta Be My Girl" - 4:02
 "Cry Together" - 5:36
 "This Time Baby" (Casey James, LeRoy Bell) - 4:43

Side two 
 "Brandy" (Joseph B. Jefferson, Charles B. Simmons) - 4:14
 "Take Me to the Stars" (Larry Hancock, Al Boyd) - 4:13
 "Help (Somebody Please)" (Eddie Levert, Robert Dukes) - 4:58
 "Strokety Stroke" (Bunny Sigler) - 4:24

Personnel 
Kenneth Gamble - producer, songwriter
Dennis Harris - guitar
Bobby Eli - guitar
Roland Chambers - guitar
Bunny Sigler - guitar, keyboards, piano, producer
Norman Harris - arranger, guitar
Ron Baker - bass guitar
Eddie Levert - vocals, songwriter
Sammy Strain - vocals
Walter Williams - vocals
Lenny Pakula - keyboards
Leon Huff - keyboards, producer, piano, songwriter
Earl Young - drums
Don Renaldo - conductor, horn, strings
Thom Bell - arranger, strings, producer, songwriter
Larry Washington - bongos, percussion
Vincent Montana Jr. - percussion, vibraphone
Tony Sellari - art direction
Bobby Martin - arranger

Charts

Weekly charts

Year-end charts

Singles

See also
List of number-one R&B albums of 1978 (U.S.)

External links
 The O'Jays-So Full Of Love at Discogs

References 

1978 albums
The O'Jays albums
Albums produced by Kenneth Gamble
Albums produced by Leon Huff
Albums arranged by Thom Bell
Albums arranged by Bobby Martin
Albums recorded at Sigma Sound Studios
Philadelphia International Records albums